The Admiralty Compass Observatory, originally known as the Compass Branch (1842–1917) and later known as the Compass Department (1917–1968) and Compass Directorate (1968–1971) was established in 1842 to provide the Royal Navy with services for the design, development, inspection, testing and repair of compasses and certain other instruments. It subsequently undertook requirements for the other services as appropriate. In when it was absorbed within the Admiralty Surface Weapons Establishment., but it continued at its original site until the early 1980's

History
In 1795, the post of Hydrographer of the Navy was created. He became responsible to the First Naval Lord for producing charts, 'Sailing Directions', 'Notices to Mariners', tide tables and light lists and for supplying chronometers, compasses and other scientific instruments to HM ships. He was also responsible for naval meteorology and for the Admiralty's links with the Meteorological Office. In 1820, the Hydrographer was responsible for the Observatory, being advised by a Board of Visitors. In 1842, a Compass Branch as part of the Hydrographic Department was established. In 1911, The Compass Branch was affiliated to the Controller of the Navy's Department. Its work in connection with terrestrial magnetism was transferred to the Royal Observatory Greenwich when it was renamed the Compass Observatory. In 1917, it moved to Ditton Park and used the house and its immediate grounds when the compass branch was elevated to a department. The Radio Research Station of the Department of Scientific and Industrial Research was co-located at Ditton Park, and provided basic information in this field. By 1968 it formed part of the Controllers Department and was renamed the Compass Directorate. In 1971, it was merged as part of the Admiralty Surface Weapons Establishment (ASWE) within the navigation division. The site was later renamed as Admiralty Research Establishment (ARE) Slough, and in its final years its became part of the Defence Research Agency (DRA) from 1991, and the Defence Evaluation and Research Agency (DERA) from 1995. After its release from Defence use, the whole site was bought by Computer Associates (now CA Technologies) in 1997.

Commander Fanning wrote a history of the establishment

Head of Branch/Department

Superintendent of Compasses
Incomplete list of post holders included:
 1842–1843 Commander Edward John Johnson
 1844–1847 Captain Edward John Johnson
 1855–1860 Captain Sir Frederick John Owen Evans
 1860 Captain Edward John Johnson
 1868–1885 Captain Ettrick William Creak
 1914–1919 Captain Frank O. Creagh-Osborne (rtd).

Assistant Superintendent of Compasses
 1868–1867, Lieutenant E. W. Creak
 1909–1913 Commander Frank Osborne Creagh-Osborne
 1913–1915 Commander Stanley B. Norfolk

References

External links

Admiralty departments
Admiralty during World War I
Admiralty during World War II
1842 establishments in the United Kingdom
1971 disestablishments in the United Kingdom